

The Hillson Helvellyn was a 1940s British two-seat training monoplane designed by Norman Sykes and built by F Hills & Sons of Trafford Park.

Design and development
With the prospect of war and the requirement for the Royal Air Force to train pilots the company decided to design a small basic trainer that could be built quickly and cheaply. The Helvellyn was a mid-wing monoplane with two tandem open cockpits and powered by a  Blackburn Cirrus Minor I piston engine. It had a conventional landing gear but was designed to be fitted with a tricycle landing gear.

Designed by Norman Sykes and built at Trafford Park in Manchester in 1939, only the prototype registered G-AFKT was completed. With an ample supply of de Havilland Tiger Moths and Miles Magisters and a lack of interest from the RAF development was stopped in 1940 and the prototype was used by the company as a liaison aircraft particularly between Barton and Ispwich. It was dismantled in November 1942.

Specifications

References

Bibliography

1930s British military trainer aircraft